SMBH may refer to:

Supermassive black hole
SMBH, Inc., structural engineers